The siege of Gaeta was a siege during the War of Polish Succession fought at Gaeta, Italy. The Habsburgs at Gaeta withstood four months of siege from the Bourbon armies under the Duke of Parma (the future Charles III of Spain).

They were defeated on 6 August 1734 when the Spanish and French stormed the city. Twenty-seven years earlier, Austrian troops under Count Wirich Philipp von Daun had laid siege to Gaeta during the War of the Spanish Succession.

The Jacobite pretender Charles Edward Stuart was present for a time as an observer, his first exposure to war.

References

History of the kingdom of Naples, 1734-1825

Battles of the War of the Polish Succession
Battles in Lazio
Sieges involving Austria
Sieges involving Spain
Sieges involving France
Conflicts in 1734
1734 in the Kingdom of Naples
Siege
Gaeta